John Loughlan (born 12 June 1943 in Coatbridge, Scotland) is a Scottish former professional footballer who played in the Football League and Scottish League as a left back for Leicester City, Greenock Morton, Crystal Palace and Wrexham. He also played non-league football for Wimbledon and Kettering Town.

Playing career 
He began his career at Leicester City in 1961, but did not make a senior appearance and in 1964 signed for Greenock Morton. He made 83 appearances for Morton scoring once before signing for Crystal Palace on 26 September 1968. His debut came on 5 October, in a 1–1 home draw against Sheffield United, and by the end of the season (in which Palace reached the top tier for the first time), Loughlan had made 29 appearances, missing only two games, but without scoring. In season 1969–70, in the top flight, Loughlan made 26 appearances, but in the following two seasons made only a total of five appearances (two of them as substitute).

In March 1972, Loughlan signed on loan with Wrexham. At the end of his loan spell he did not return to Palace, but signed instead for Wimbledon (at that time a non-league team) for whom he made 75 appearances before moving on to Kettering Town in 1974, where he finished his career.

Managerial career 
After retiring as a player, Loughlan managed Corby Town.

References

External links

Loughlan at holmesdale.net

1943 births
Living people
Footballers from Coatbridge
Scottish footballers
Association football fullbacks
Leicester City F.C. players
Greenock Morton F.C. players
Crystal Palace F.C. players
Wrexham A.F.C. players
Wimbledon F.C. players
Kettering Town F.C. players
English Football League players
Scottish Football League players